Ukal is a rural locality (a selo) in Tlyaratinsky Selsoviet, Tlyaratinsky District, Republic of Dagestan, Russia. The population was 481 as of 2010.

Geography 
Ukal is located 3 km north of Tlyarata (the district's administrative centre) by road. Tilutl is the nearest rural locality.

References 

Rural localities in Tlyaratinsky District